The Hon. Isobel Marie Ellul-Hammond MBE, (born 26 November 1979) is a Gibraltarian politician. She has been a Member of the Gibraltar Parliament for the Gibraltar Social Democrats (GSD) since 2011. In 2007 she founded the Breast Cancer Awareness Charity, and also helped inaugurate the Prostate Cancer Support Group Gibraltar. She was made a Member of the Most Excellent Order of the British Empire (MBE) at the Queen's 2011 New Year Honours for services to the community in Gibraltar.

References

External links 
 Isobel Ellul-Hammond at the GSD website.

Alumni of the University of Bath
Alumni of the University of Leicester
Gibraltar Social Democrats politicians
Gibraltarian women in politics
Living people
Members of the Order of the British Empire
21st-century British women politicians
1979 births